"Where Did You Go?" is a song by English DJ Jax Jones featuring British singer MNEK.  It was released on 5  February 2022, via Polydor Records. The song peaked at number 7 on the UK Singles Chart.  When he performed it at the Queen's Platinum Party at the Palace in London, John Newman joined him on stage for the vocals. The cover art features smile-shaped potato bites, similar to McCain Smiles.

Credits and personnel
Credits adapted from AllMusic.

 Tom Demac – producer, programming
 MNEK – composer, featured artist, primary artist, vocals
 Kevin Grainger – mastering engineer, mixing
 Wayne Hector – composer
 Jax Jones – musical producer, primary artist, producer, programming
 Timucin Lam – composer
 Mark Ralph – composer, producer, programming
 SIBA – composer, producer, programming

Charts

Weekly charts

Monthly charts

Year-end charts

Certifications

References

2022 singles
2022 songs
Jax Jones songs
MNEK songs
Eurodance songs
Number-one singles in Poland
Songs written by Jax Jones
Songs written by Mark Ralph (record producer)
Songs written by MNEK
Songs written by Wayne Hector
Song recordings produced by Mark Ralph (record producer)
Song recordings produced by Jax Jones